Nicely is a surname. Notable people with the surname include:

Nick Nicely (born 1959), British singer-songwriter
Jonnie Nicely (1936–2013), American model
 (1943—2019), US mathematician, discoverer of the Pentium FDIV bug